Amethyst, Princess of Gemworld is a superhero published in American comic books created by DC Comics. Created by writers Dan Mishkin,  Gary Cohn and artist Ernie Colón, she debuted in The Legion of Superheroes #298 in April 1983.

Born into the Amethyst royal family of Gemworld, a fictional dimension full of magic and magical creatures, her parents were killed shortly after her birth by her future archenemy, Dark Opal. She is hidden on Earth by a witch and is adopted into a family, given the name Amy Winston. Eventually, she travels to Gemworld on her thirteenth birthday, learning of her heritage and became Gemworld's chief protector by opposing the Lords of Chaos and their agents, including Dark Opal. After the events of Flashpoint, the character was retroactively rebooted, having first been raised by her mother Graciel to help eventually liberate Gemworld from a tyrannical ruler. Her given birth name is Amaya while her human identity is Amy Winston.  After DC Rebirth, the character's original origin is restored, albeit without significant connection to the Lords of Chaos and Order.

The character has received several media adaptations, having been featured in a short animation series featured on the DC Nation block on Cartoon Network.

Publication history

Concept and creation 
Amethyst's premise was initially pitched to DC Comics under the title "Changeling", wherein its main character had been left on Earth as an infant. However, because another DC superhero formerly named Beast Boy was currently using that name at the time, Dan Mishkin decided on the alternative "Amethyst" as a replacement. This in turn inspired the jewel-themed renaming of the other characters in the series and the conceptual rebranding of the entire concept as "Gemworld".

Amethyst volumes 

Amethyst first appeared as a special insert preview in The Legion of Super-Heroes #298 (April 1983). Her original story began shortly afterward in the twelve-issue Amethyst: Princess of Gemworld limited series in 1983, written and created by Dan Mishkin and Gary Cohn with Ernie Colón as the artist. The initial 12-issue limited series (identified by DC Comics as a "maxi-series") establishes Gemworld, Amethyst's identity, and several of her recurring villains. The limited series was followed by a 1984 annual and a sixteen-issue ongoing series. The ongoing series was followed by the 1986 Amethyst Special one-shot and a four-issue limited series that ended the character's adventures (penciled by Esteban Maroto). There was also a one-shot with Superman in DC Comics Presents #63 (Nov. 1983).

The character re-emerged in 2005 after 18 years of sporadic appearances, in the Infinite Crisis mini-series. In 2012, Amethyst appeared as the main character of the new Sword of Sorcery as part of The New 52 line. This lasted until May 2013, when Sword of Sorcery was cancelled.

In 2019, DC relaunched the Young Justice title, with Amethyst as one of the members. A six-issue miniseries Amethyst (2020) by Amy Reeder was published the following year.

Collected edition 
In 2012, DC published an Amethyst volume of the Showcase Presents series. It reprinted the character's appearances in The Legion of Super-Heroes #298, the original Amethyst, Princess of Gemworld 12-issue limited series, Amethyst Annual #1, DC Comics Presents #63, and the first 11 issues of the 16-issue ongoing Amethyst series.

Crossover appearances 
Amethyst appeared in the 1997 "Convergence" crossover that ran through Book of Fate, Night Force, Challengers of the Unknown and Scare Tactics. This story depicts an alternate Gemworld experiencing a civil war. Here, Amethyst is portrayed as a villain who wants to unify all the family houses in Gemworld by any means.

In the alternate timeline of the 2011 Flashpoint storyline, Amethyst is a member of the Secret Seven.

Fictional character biography

Princess Amethyst, the daughter of the ruling House of Amethyst, was orphaned by Dark Opal of the House of Opal. Following the death of Amethyst's parents, the witch Citrina whisks her away to be reared in safety by the Winston family on Earth.

At the age of thirteen, Amethyst is attacked by Dark Opal. After her return to Gemworld, Amethyst discovers her magical powers and decides to use them to rebel against Dark Opal's oppression over Gemworld. Upon befriending the winged unicorn Max, Amethyst journeys in search of allies among The Twelve Kingdoms of Gemworld that do not support Dark Opal. She is successful in rallying support from most of the other Houses and gains friendship in Lord Topaz, Lady Turquoise, and Princess Emerald (Emmy). The first series ends with the defeat of Dark Opal, the liberation of Gemworld, and Amethyst's return to Earth.

During the second series released in 1986 it is revealed that in the aftermath of Dark Opal's defeat, conflict among the other Royal Houses of Gemworld caused friction throughout the surrounding kingdoms. The Lords of Chaos attempt to capitalize on Amethyst's absence and threaten to overtake Gemworld. During this time, Amethyst learns from Doctor Fate that she is a member of the Lords of Order as her father was. Amethyst is unique among the Lords as the only creation with a truly human form. After struggling with this revelation, she finally accepts her destiny and battles the Lord of Chaos known as The Child and his servant Flaw, the Gemstone Golem. After defeating Flaw, Amethyst ends the battle between herself and The Child by merging him with Gemworld. As a consequence, she is forced to merge with The Child.

The Amethyst miniseries sees the characters' return from their fates and takes place about two decades after Crisis on Infinite Earths (time passes differently in Gemworld). When 20 years of time pass in the Gemworld dimension, only 13 years time will pass on Earth. Lord Topaz and Lady Turquoise are married and have three children: twin sons Wrynn and Donal, and four-year-old daughter Amber. The miniseries also sees the rise of Mordru in the form of Wrynn when he accidentally summons Flaw back to life. With the help of Flaw and The Lords of Chaos, Mordru transforms himself into a powerful sorcerer. He would become Amethyst's greatest enemy and goes on to plague the Legion of Super-Heroes in the 30th Century.

After his transformation into Mordru, Wrynn sets off on conquest which eventually leads to a confrontation with Amethyst and in which Flaw is destroyed. Amethyst pursues Wrynn across Gemworld where they battle a second time. Meanwhile, The Child has returned and abducted a now-adult Emmy from Earth. He plans to use her as leverage for Mordru in order to defeat Amethyst. The ploy eventually fails as Donal arrives to help Amethyst, who is able to temporarily restore Wrynn to his former self. Wrynn begs Donal to free him from Mordru's influence by killing him. Before Donal is able to fulfil the request he is distracted by Topaz's objections. This distraction allows Mordru to regain control of Wrynn and kill Donal. Enraged, Amethyst pulls The Child out of Emmy's body and banishes him back to Gemworld.

In the final issue of the miniseries Mordru is sentenced to banishment from The Twelve Kingdoms of Gemworld following his defeat. Amethyst, dissatisfied with this sentence and angry over Donal's murder, banishes Mordru into Gemworld by merging him with the planet where he remains for many years. Amber is revealed to be Amethyst's daughter, not Topaz and Turquoise's. Realizing that the end of her time on Earth has brought imbalance to the forces between order and chaos, Amethyst charges Emmy with the care of her daughter and takes them both back to Earth. Amethyst returns to Gemworld and merges with the planet. By displacing Gemworld into Earth's universe, the setting is a "possible" future +13 years following the Crisis on Infinite Earths series. Time passes and the Gemworld is renamed Zerox. Late in the 30th century, Zerox (The Sorcerers World) is destroyed by an entity battling the Legion of Super Heroes in LSH series (1984) #60-63 ("The Magic Wars"). The planet is reduced to asteroid rubble and Amethyst is killed.

During the Infinite Crisis storyline, Amethyst is first seen battling the Spectre on Gemworld in Infinite Crisis #2 and survived the attack. She later appears among the magical beings who are summoned to reconstruct the shattered Rock of Eternity in the Day of Vengeance Special. Amethyst is seen once again in Infinite Crisis #6 where she and other sorcerers pool their powers to summon the restored Spectre to Stonehenge. In the aftermath of the event, all of the other Lords of Order are apparently destroyed by the Spectre, signaling the end of the Ninth Age of Magic and leaving Amethyst as the only known surviving Lord of Order in the Tenth Age of Magic.

Infinite Crisis erases the events of the 1987 Amethyst four-issue mini series. Amethyst never goes into 20 years (13 years Earth time) of crystal glass hibernation and is awakened prematurely by the Spectre. Amber (her magical construct daughter) is not created. Her friend Princess Emerald, the Gemworld royal families, and Earth family have unknown fates. Further illustrating that timeline is deleted, Mordru (a Chaos immortal energy being from Cilia) exists many eons before his "creation" in the Gemworld "origin" back story (making this a contradiction); the villain has battles against Dr. Fate and the Justice Society following the Post-Crisis time. Moreover Mordru possesses former sorcerer Arion (Lord of Atlantis) and never Wrynn (Justice Society, #42-50, 1999). Donal, Wrynn, and Amber are post-Infinite Crisis (alternate timeline) characters no longer existing in the DCU. About 4 years of DC comics time passes between Crisis on Infinite Earths and Infinite Crisis. In the revised continuity, the Gemworld (Zerox) is not destroyed during the 30th century.

The New 52
In 2012, DC relaunched the long defunct Sword of Sorcery title as part of The New 52 (a reboot of the DC Comics universe) with Amethyst as the lead story written by Christy Marx with art by Aaron Lopresti. In this version, Amethyst is Princess Amaya of House Amethyst, taken to Earth and raised as Amy Winston by her mother Lady Graciel in order to protect her from Amaya's ruthless aunt Mordiel, who has usurped control of their house.

Amethyst later joins the Justice League Dark upon being brought to Earth in an effort to reconnect Tim Hunter with magic. Amethyst remains on the team in order to recover the portal stone that John Constantine has stolen. She is told not to trust any promises Constantine has made. Soon after, she has an adventure while exploring the House of Mystery with her allies Black Orchid and Frankenstein. They destroy several malicious threats that try to devour them.

During the "Trinity War" storyline, Amethyst is among the superheroes that feel the disturbance in the magical plane when Shazam picks up Pandora's Box.

Wonder Comics
In 2019, DC relaunched the Young Justice title, with Amethyst as one of the members. On this Gemworld, there is no time difference passing between dimensions. If one day passes on Earth, then only one day passes on the Gemworld. Dark Opal exists as an ongoing villain and apparently has never died.

Powers and abilities
Amethyst possesses a host of powers, including flight, spell-casting, energy manipulation, and matter transmutation, and can tap other sources of magical energy to amplify her own powers. She is powerful enough to engage in battle with the Spectre and survive.

In other media

Television

In 2013, a series of short animated features starring Amethyst, voiced by Sophie Oda, were aired as part of the DC Nation block on Cartoon Network. The seven-episode series used designs by Brianne Drouhard and was animated by Japanese studio David Production. These shorts portray Gemworld as a video game into which Amy Winston is magically transported to battle the forces of Dark Opal. It modernizes Amethyst's design, making her a Japanese-inspired magical girl, and pits her against monsters reminiscent of stock and classic video game antagonists.

Film
 Amethyst has a cameo appearance in the animated film DC Super Hero Girls: Hero of the Year, voiced by Cristina Pucelli.
 Amethyst has a brief cameo in Teen Titans Go! To the Movies and can be seen in occasional episodes of Teen Titans Go!.

References

External links

 Amethyst, Princess of Gemworld at Don Markstein's Toonopedia. Archived from the original on April 4, 2012.
 DCU Guide: Amethyst
 Absorbascon: Amethyst retrospective
 Sequential Tart: Amethyst retrospective
 TangonaT: Amethyst retrospective
 ComiXology: Amethyst retrospective (Archived 2009-10-25)

1983 comics debuts
Comics characters introduced in 1983
DC Comics characters who use magic
DC Comics child superheroes
DC Comics fantasy characters
DC Comics female superheroes
DC Comics limited series 
DC Comics titles
Comics adapted into animated series
Comics adapted into television series
Fictional characters with elemental transmutation abilities
Fictional characters with energy-manipulation abilities
Fictional princesses
Female_soldier_and_warrior_characters_in_comics
Winged unicorns